Johannes Petrus Jacobus 'Hansie' Graaff (born 10 September 1989 in Pretoria) is a South African rugby union player for Bayonne in the Top 14 in France. He is a utility back that can play as a fly-half, centre, winger or full-back.He is also known as the bulldog because of his aggressive style of play, he once tackled everyone on the pitch even the referee.

Career

Varsity Cup rugby

He sprung to prominence playing for a struggling  side in the Varsity Cup between 2010 and 2012, scoring six tries in 21 appearances during the three seasons.

Griffons / Cheetahs

Two more substitute appearances followed in the same competition before a highly successful 2012 Currie Cup First Division campaign, where Graaff scored 134 points in fifteen starts to finish fourth in the scoring charts.

This led to his inclusion in the final  squad for the 2013 Super Rugby season, but he failed to make any appearances for them. Instead, a further seven appearances followed in the 2013 Vodacom Cup and 2013 Currie Cup First Division competitions.

Sharks

Eastern Province Kings

He joined Port Elizabeth-based side  prior to the 2014 Currie Cup Premier Division season. In June 2014, he was selected in the starting line-up for the  side to face  during a tour match during a 2014 incoming tour. He made his debut for the Eastern Province Kings, playing 72 minutes of the match as the Kings suffered a 12–34 defeat.

However, he didn't feature in their 2014 Currie Cup Premier Division campaign, instead being loaned to neighbours  for one match. He eventually made his debut for the EP Kings in a domestic competition by starting their first match of the 2015 Vodacom Cup season, a 19–27 defeat to defending champions .

SWD Eagles

El Salvador

After the 2016 Currie Cup, Graaff joined Spanish División de Honor side El Salvador.

RCME Massy 
During the 2018-2019 season, Graaff played for RCME Massy, in the French Pro D2.

Aviron Bayonnais 
Graaff moved to Aviron Bayonnais for the 2019 season, a Top14 club of the French Championship.

References

South African rugby union players
Living people
1989 births
Rugby union players from Pretoria
Griffons (rugby union) players
Sharks (Currie Cup) players
Eastern Province Elephants players
Tshwane University of Technology alumni
Rugby union fullbacks